Taiwo Olayinka Afolabi (born April 29, 1962), MON, is a Nigerian business magnate and lawyer. He is the founder and current C.E.O of SIFAX Group, a conglomerate that deals in Maritime, Aviation, Haulage, Hospitality, Financial Services and Oil and Gas.

Early life and education
Afolabi was born as the first child of a set of twins in Ondo State, but he is a native of Idokunusi Ijebu in Ijebu East local government area of Ogun State, Nigeria. He completed his primary and secondary school education at Ansar Ud Deen Primary School, Ondo State, and Baptist Grammar School, Ibadan respectively. He later proceeded to the University of Lagos where he graduated with an LL.B. certificate in Law.

Career
In 1981, he began his professional career with Nigerian Express Agencies Limited until 1988 when he left to establish SIFAX Group. Upon its establishment, the company has since risen to become one of Nigeria's leading companies with investments in oil and gas, haulage, logistics and maritime and aviation. He is a Fellow of the Nigeria Institute of Financial Management, and the Institute of Freight Forwarders of Nigeria.

Recognitions
Afolabi is a Member of the Order of the Niger since 2010. In recognition of his contribution to the Nigerian industrial sector, he was awarded the 2014 "Businessman of the Year" by The Sun Awards. The Taiwo Afolabi Annual Maritime Conference (TAAM Conference) is organized in honor of Taiwo Afolabi by students of the University of Lagos and sponsored by SIFAX Group.

Personal life
He is married to Folashade Afolabi and is the father Olayinka Afolabi and L.A.X, a Nigerian recording artist. He is a member of the Institute of Directors Nigeria; Ikoyi Club 1938; IBB Golf Club, Abuja; the Building Committee of the Nigerian-British Chamber of Commerce and Industry, amongst many others.

Dr. Taiwo Afolabi is a sports lover, who enjoys watching and playing football.

Philanthropy life
His company SIFAX donated a one thousand seater (1,000) lecture hall to the Ladoke Akintola University of Technology (LAUTECH). A total of 184 persons have enjoyed free dental and medical care at the Taiwo Afolabi Free Rural Dental Outreach which was held at the popular Dugbe market in Ibadan recently. The beneficiaries included market men and women.

References

1962 births
Living people
People from Ogun State
Yoruba businesspeople
University of Lagos alumni
Nigerian twins
20th-century Nigerian businesspeople
21st-century Nigerian businesspeople